Brian Mwila (born 16 June 1994) is a Zambian professional footballer who plays as a striker for Buildcon F.C. and  the Zambian national team.

Mwila's playing career begun in his native Zambia where he turned out for Lime Hotspurs, Kabwe Warriors and Green Buffaloes before moving to South Africa to join Platinum Stars in 2017. He left the club shortly after to return to Zambia where he joined Buildcon and later that year joined Altach.

He made his senior international debut for Zambia earlier in 2017 and helped his nation to a runners-up finish in the COSAFA Cup later that year.

Club career

Early career
Mwila's professional career started in 2013 when he was signed from a provincial academy side by Lime Hotspurs. He enjoyed a successful debut season with the club which earned him a transfer to Kabwe Warriors, before moving again to join Green Buffaloes in 2015.

Platinum Stars

Following an impressive showing with Zambia at the 2017 COSAFA Cup in South Africa, Mwila was courted by PSL sides Baroka and Platinum Stars. An agreement was reached with Baroka in July 2017 but the player later elected to join Platinum Stars on a three-year contract after the club offered him an improved deal.

Having missed the opening months of the season through an injury sustained on international duty, he made his debut for the club on 19 October, coming on as a second-half substitute in a 1–1 PSL draw with Orlando Pirates. In December 2017, having made only a handful of appearances for the club, Mwila returned to Zambia for the Christmas holidays but failed to return for the second half of the season.

Buildcon
Following his departure from Platinum Stars, Mwila signed for Buildcon in February 2018. There he spent four months at the club but scored only twice before leaving at the end of the season. In June 2018, Mwila was again involved in a transfer controversy when he was reported to have signed for Egyptian Premier League club Smouha on a three-year contract. It was later revealad that he had never signed a contract with the Egyptian side and he temporarily remained a Buildcon player.

SCR Altach
The following month, Mwila signed for Austrian side SCR Altach on a three-year deal. He scored his first goals for the club on 7 October 2018, netting twice in a 2–0 league win over Austria Wien.

International career

Zambia national football team
Mwila made his debut for Zambia against Gabon on 4 June 2017 and scored his first goal in a friendly match against South Africa nine days later. The following month, he featured at the 2017 COSAFA Cup hosted in South Africa where he scored two goals before Zambia fell to Zimbabwe in the final. He continued his form in 2017 with two goals in two matches against Swaziland before netting a brace in World Cup qualifying against Algeria in September.

Career statistics

International

International goals
As of match played 11 November 2017. Zambia score listed first, score column indicates score after each Mwila goal.

References

1994 births
People from Ndola
Living people
Zambian footballers
Zambia international footballers
Platinum Stars F.C. players
South African Premier Division players
Association football forwards
Buildcon F.C. players
SC Rheindorf Altach players
F91 Dudelange players
Austrian Football Bundesliga players
Zambian expatriate footballers
Expatriate soccer players in South Africa
Zambian expatriate sportspeople in South Africa
Expatriate footballers in Austria
Expatriate footballers in Luxembourg
Zambia Super League players